'This is a list of Swedish torpedo boats.

Torpedo boats
1st class torpedo boats

  (1896–1916), V20 (1916–1926))
  (1898–1921), V27 (1921–1947)
  (1899–1921), V28 (1921–1947)
  (1899–1921), V29 (1921–1937)
  (1900–1921), V30 (1921–1947)
  (1900–1921), V31 (1921–1937)
  (1900–1921), V32 (1921–1937)
  (1902–1921), V33 (1921–1941)
  (1902)-1921), V34 (1921–1943)
  (1903–1921), V35 (1921–1947)
  (1903–1921), V36 (1921–1942)
  (1904–1921), V37 (1921–1937)
  (1905–1926), V38 (1926–1930)
  (1909–1928), V39 (1928–1947)
  (1909–1928), V40 (1928–1947)
  (1908–1928), V41 (1928–1947)
  (1909–1928), V42 (1928–1947)
  (1909–1928), V43 (1928–1947)
  (1909–1928), V44 (1928–1940)
  (1909–1928), V45 (1928–1947)
  (1909–1928), V46 (1928–1940)
  (1910–1928), V47 (1928–1947)
  (1910–1928), V48 (1928–1947)
  (1910–1928), V49 (1928–1944)
  (1910–1928), V50 (1928–1944)
  (1909–1928), V51 (1928–1940)
  (1909–1928), V52 (1928–1940)
  (1911–1928), V53 (1928–1941)
  (1911–1928), V54'' (1928–1941)

2nd class torpedo boats

Perseus class 1951-1967

1954-1973

Spica-class torpedo boat 1966-1987

Missile boats

Norrköping class (Spica II) 1973-1983

(Spica II) 1983-2005
  (R131)
  (R131)

References

External links

 
torpedo boats
Swedish Navy lists
Swedish Navy